Md. Julfiker Murtuja Chowdhury is a Bangladesh Nationalist Party politician and the former member of parliament for Thakurgaon-2.

Career
Zulfiqar was elected to parliament from Thakurgaon-2 as a Bangladesh Nationalist Party candidate in 15 February 1996 Bangladeshi general election. He was defeated from Thakurgaon-2 constituency on 12 June 1996 on the nomination of Bangladesh Nationalist Party.

He submitted his nomination papers for the Eleventh Parliamentary Election of 2019 and later withdrew them.

References

Bangladesh Nationalist Party politicians
Living people
6th Jatiya Sangsad members
Year of birth missing (living people)